Harris County High School is a public high school serving grades 9 through 12. The school is located in Hamilton, Georgia, United States, in Harris County. The school mascot is a tiger, called Tano, and the school colors are black and gold. The school was established in 1956.

History
Harris County High School was founded in 1955, and was originally located on the current site of Harris County Carver Middle School until 1998. The new location of the school was built just west of town, where it stands today, and was completed in 1998.

The school was hit by an EF2 tornado in 2011, damaging the football field, gym, portions of the school roof, and numerous cars in the parking lot, as well as destroying the locker room adjacent to the football field. No injuries or fatalities occurred.

Clubs and activities

The school offers numerous clubs and activities, such as:

 Academic Bowl
 Band: The Sound of the County
 Beta Club
 FBLA (Future Business Leaders of America)
 FCA (Fellowship of Christian Athletes)
 FFA (Future Farmers of America)
 HOSA
 Key Club
 Math Team
 NAHS (National Art Honor Society)
 NEHS (National English Honor Society)
 NHS (National Honor Society)
 S3 (Students Standing Strong)
 Science Olympiad
 SNHS (Science National Honor Society)
 Thespian Society
TSA (Technology Student Association)
Robotics Club

Notable alumni
 Jordan Jenkins, football player
 TaQuon Marshall, football player
 Tae Crowder, football player

References

External links
Harris County High School
Harris County School District

Public high schools in Georgia (U.S. state)
Schools in Harris County, Georgia